is a retired Japanese speed skater. She competed at the 1968 and  1972 Winter Olympics in the 500, 1000 and 1500 m events with the best achievement of ninth place in the 500 m in 1972. She badly fell on the same distance in 1968.

She is sometimes confused with Jitsuko Saito who also competed in speed skating at the 1968 Olympics.

Personal bests:
500 m – 43.8 (1972)
1000 m – 1:29.4 (1972)
1500 m – 2:19.8 (1972)
3000 m – 5:02.9 (1972)

References

External links

Sachiko SAITO-YOBEKURA. les-sports.info

1947 births
Japanese female speed skaters
Speed skaters at the 1968 Winter Olympics
Speed skaters at the 1972 Winter Olympics
Olympic speed skaters of Japan
Sportspeople from Hiroshima Prefecture
People from Hiroshima
Living people